In Darkness may refer to:

 In Darkness (2009 film), a 2009 Turkish film
 In Darkness (2011 film), a 2011 Polish film
 In Darkness (2018 film), a 2018 American film
 In Darkness (album), a 2013 album by German band Agathodaimon
 Poet Anderson: ...In Darkness, a 2018 American novel by Tom DeLonge and Suzanne Young